, or formally , is a district in Chiyoda, Tokyo, Japan. It consists of 3 chōme. As of March 1, 2007, the district's population is 875.

Kanda-Ogawamachi is located on the northern part of Chiyoda. It borders Kanda-Sarugakuchō, Kanda-Surugadai and Kanda-Awajichō to the north, Kanda-Sudachō to the east, Kanda-Nishikichō, Kanda-Tsukasamachi and Kanda-Mitoshirochō to the south, and Kanda-Jinbōchō to the east.

A commercial neighborhood, Kanda-Ogawamachi is home to a number of buildings and stores. Notably, many sporting-goods stores can be found on Yasukuni-Dori Ave. Since the district is located adjacent to Kanda-Jinbōchō, home to a massive book town, several publishers and bookstores can be found as well.

Education
 operates public elementary and junior high schools. Shōhei Elementary School (千代田区立昌平小学校) is the zoned elementary school for Kanda-Ogawamachi 1-chōme. Ochanomizu Elementary School (お茶の水小学校) is the zoned elementary school for Kanda-Ogawamachi 2-3-chōme. There is a freedom of choice system for junior high schools in Chiyoda Ward, and so there are no specific junior high school zones.

References

Districts of Chiyoda, Tokyo